Say-Otes (also known as Sayötesh or Say-Utes (Say-Ötes, ساي-وتەس)) is a town in Mangystau Region, southwest Kazakhstan. It has a population of 1,571.

References

Mangystau Region
Cities and towns in Kazakhstan